Juha Pekaristo is a Finnish male curler.

At the national level, he is a five-time Finnish men's champion curler (2008, 2010, 2015, 2018, 2020), a 2010 Finnish mixed champion curler and a two-time Finnish junior champion curler (1998, 1999).

He started curling in 1993.

Teams

Men's

Mixed

References

External links

Living people
Finnish male curlers
Finnish curling champions
Date of birth missing (living people)
Place of birth missing (living people)
Year of birth missing (living people)
21st-century Finnish people